

Orrin Porter Miller (September 11, 1858 – July 7, 1918) was a member of the presiding bishopric of the Church of Jesus Christ of Latter-day Saints (LDS Church) from 1901 to his death.

Born in Millcreek, Utah Territory, Miller was a local leader in the church prior to his call as a general authority. He became the bishop of the newly created Riverton Ward in Salt Lake City in 1886. Prior to serving as a bishop, he had been an elder and a seventy in the church. In 1900, when the Salt Lake Stake of the church was divided in two, Miller was selected as the first president of the new Jordan Stake.

In 1901, Miller was selected as the second counselor to presiding bishop William B. Preston. Miller was replacing John R. Winder, who had earlier been asked to become a member of the First Presidency of the church. Miller served as Preston's counselor until Preston resigned due to ill health in 1907. Charles W. Nibley became the new presiding bishop, and he asked Miller to become his first counselor. Miller served as Nibley's first counselor until he died of stomach cancer in Salt Lake City at the age of 59.

See also 

 Council on the Disposition of the Tithes
 David A. Smith (Mormon)
 Robert T. Burton

Notes

References 
 Andrew Jenson, Latter-day Saints Biographical Encyclopedia, vol. 1, p. 307; vol. 3, p. 764

External links 
 Grampa Bill's G.A. Pages: Orrin P. Miller

1858 births
1918 deaths
American general authorities (LDS Church)
Deaths from cancer in Utah
Counselors in the Presiding Bishopric (LDS Church)
Deaths from stomach cancer
People from Salt Lake City
Latter Day Saints from Utah